The Norwegian Bridge Federation (NBF) founded in 1932, is the national body for bridge in Norway.

The Norwegian Bridge Federation was founded by Inga and Odd Arnesen on 29 January 1932 ; at that time it had three member clubs. Another national bridge organisation had been founded on 30 November 1931 by Wilhelm Nickelsen; by mutual agreement, this was merged into what is now the NBF in April 1932.

It currently has 380 member clubs, divided into 25 circuits. The federation is a member of the European Bridge League, which in turn is a member organisation of the World Bridge Federation, and is also a member of the Norwegian Mind Sports Federation (Norsk Tankesportforbund).  it has 9,203 registered members. In 1993, it was decided that the organisation should publish a periodical six times a year; the first issue of Norsk Bridge was published in February 1995, although since 2006 the frequency has been reduced to four times a year.

The organisation's office is at Ullevaal Stadion. Since 2016, the president has been Kari-Anne Opsal The vice-president is Astrid Lybæk. The general secretary is Allan Livgård.


Administration

Bridge in Norway

Norway is one of the top nations in bridge; the country won the world team championship in 2007, the NBF's 75th anniversary year, took silver in 1993 and 2001, and bronze in 1997, and in 2008 at the first World Mind Sports Games in Beijing won more medals than any other nation, two gold, one silver and three bronze. However, despite a "massive recruiting effort under the auspices of the NBF", the game attracts few young people and the average age of bridge club members is rising.

See also
World Bridge Federation
List of bridge federations

References

External links
 

Clubs and societies in Norway
Sports organizations established in 1932
Contract bridge governing bodies